The leopards who have run with me is a Persian language short story collection written by Iranian writer Bijan Najdi. The book was published in Iran in 1997.

References

Persian-language books
1997 short story collections
Iranian books
Iranian short story collections